Oodji (in 1998–2011 - OGGI) is a youth fashion chain operating in Russia and former Soviet countries. The brand is specialized in the development and production of clothes and the distribution through a wide network of brand shops.

History 
The first OGGI shop opened its doors in 1998 in Saint Petersburg. From 1998 to 2011 was working under the brand "OGGI", producing only women clothes and accessories. Since 2011 the brand produce men's clothes and accessories, since 2012 - kids' clothes and shoes. Over 280 OGGI shops have been opened since 1998 in more than a hundred cities around Russia and Ukraine. In 2011-2015 Oodji had shops in Poland, Czech Republic and Slovenia. The brand belongs to the "August" company (the head - Dmitriy Garbuzov).

Boycott of OGGI 

Since 2013, in Ukraine company has become the object of attention of activists of the campaign "Do not buy Russian goods!" Activists urge not to buy in markets "OGGI" nothing pointing to the owners of Russian origin network. Also OGGI hit to public lists of Russian goods of activists and journalists.

Stores 
: 252 stores

: 28 stores
: 5 stores
: 2 stores
: 15 stores
: 4 stores
: 5 stores
: 3 stores
: 5 stores
: 2 stores

References

External links
Official website

Companies based in Saint Petersburg
Clothing companies established in 1998
Retail companies established in 1998
Clothing brands
Clothing companies of Russia
Clothing brands of Russia
Multinational companies headquartered in Russia
Russian brands